The following is a list of dams in Ishikawa Prefecture, Japan.

List

See also

References 

Ishikawa